The Jõku River is a river in Estonia in Tõrva Parish, Valga County. The river is 33 km long and its basin size is 83.3 km2. It runs from Virtsjärv into the Õhne River.

The Nähri caves are located along the river.

References

Rivers of Estonia
Tõrva Parish